Gunnhildur Fríða Hallgrímsdóttir (born 1 May 2002) is an Icelandic politician and activist. In December 2021 she became the youngest Icelandic parliamentarian in the history of Alþingi when she took a seat as a deputy member for the Pirate Party at the age of 19.

As of 2021, she is a student at Harvard University.

References

External links
Bio at Alþingi

2002 births
Living people
Gunnhildur Fríða Hallgrímsdóttir
Gunnhildur Fríða Hallgrímsdóttir
Gunnhildur Fríða Hallgrímsdóttir
Gunnhildur Fríða Hallgrímsdóttir
Gunnhildur Fríða Hallgrímsdóttir